Colpo di Coda is a double live album from Italian rock band Litfiba and was recorded during the Bologna concert of the Terremoto tour. It contains two previously unreleased tracks "A denti stretti" and "Africa".

Track listing

CD one
 A denti stretti – 4:05
 Sotto il vulcano – 5:51
 Soldi – 4:25
 Dinosauro – 3:45
 Resisti – 4:25
 Woda-Woda – 3:40
 Gioconda – 6:10
 Il mistero di Giulia – 6:51
 Fata Morgana – 5:04

CD two
 Gira nel mio cerchio – 3:57
 Maudit – 5:18
 Dimmi il nome – 4:32
 Prima guardia – 4:55
 El diablo – 4:19
 Proibito – 4:21
 Tex'n'duet – 5:44
 Africa – 4:39
 Cangaceiro – 6:41

Personnel
Piero Pelù - Vocals
Ghigo Renzulli - Guitars
Franco Caforio - Drums
Antonio Aiazzi – Keyboards
Roberto Terzani - Bass
Fabrizio Simoncioni Recording and mixing
Produced by Alberto Pirelli

Litfiba albums
1994 live albums
EMI Records live albums
Italian-language albums